Pobershau is a former municipality in the district Erzgebirgskreis, in Saxony, Germany. With effect from 1 January 2012, it has been incorporated into the town of Marienberg.

Geography 
Pobershau lies in the valley of the Red Pockau, a tributary of the Black Pockau. The hamlet of Rittersberg lies north of the main village on the left slopes of the Red Pockau. The hamlet of Hinterer Grund lie east of the village rather remotely in the valley of the Black Pockau. The highest point in Pobershaus lies at  near the Katzensteine mountain.

Subdivisions 
The municipality is divided into: 
 Pobershau
 Rittersberg

References 

Former municipalities in Saxony
Marienberg